Athletics at the 1968 Summer Paralympics consisted of 70 events, 35 for men and 35 for women.

Participating nations

Medal table

Medal summary

Men's events

Women's events

References 

 

 
1968 Summer Paralympics events
1968
Paralympics